Malewo may refer to the following places:
Malewo, Greater Poland Voivodeship (west-central Poland)
Malewo, Łódź Voivodeship (central Poland)
Malewo, Masovian Voivodeship (east-central Poland)
Malewo, Pomeranian Voivodeship (north Poland)